Heinz Linge (23 March 1913 – 9 March 1980) was a German SS officer who served as a valet for the leader of Nazi Germany, Adolf Hitler, and became known for his close personal proximity to historical events. Linge was present in the Führerbunker on 30 April 1945, when Hitler committed suicide. Linge's ten-year service to Hitler ended at that time. In the aftermath of the Second World War in Europe, Linge spent ten years in Soviet captivity.

According to his memoir, titled With Hitler to the End and published by Skyhorse in 2014, "Linge was responsible for all aspects of Hitler’s household". Despite the circumstances of the war, Linge's portrayal of the Führer has been described as "affectionate", although Hitler as a supervisor acted in a manner "unpredictable and demanding".

Early life and education 
Linge was born in Bremen, Germany. He was employed as a bricklayer prior to joining the SS in 1933. He served in the Leibstandarte SS Adolf Hitler (LSSAH), Hitler's bodyguard. In 1934, when he was part of No. 1 Guard to Hitler's residence on the Obersalzberg near Berchtesgaden, Linge was selected to serve at the Reich Chancellery. By the end of the war, he had obtained the rank of SS-Obersturmbannführer (lieutenant colonel).

Valet to Hitler 
On 24 January 1935, Linge was chosen to be a valet for Hitler. He was one of three valets at that time. In September 1939, Linge replaced Karl Wilhelm Krause as chief valet for Hitler. Linge worked as a valet in the Reich Chancellery in Berlin, at Hitler's residence near Berchtesgaden, and at Wolfsschanze in Rastenburg. He stated that his daily routine was to wake Hitler each day at 11:00 AM and provide morning newspapers and messages. Linge would then keep him stocked with writing materials and spectacles for his morning reading session in bed. Hitler would then dress himself to a stopwatch with Linge acting as a "referee". He would take a light breakfast of tea, biscuits and an apple and a vegetarian lunch at 2:30 PM. Dinner with only a few guests present was at 8.00pm. As Hitler's valet, Linge was also a member of the Führerbegleitkommando which provided personal security protection for Hitler. By 1944, he was also head of Hitler's personal service staff. Besides accompanying Hitler on all his travels, he was responsible for the accommodations; all the servants, mess orderlies, cooks, caterers and maids were "subordinate" to Linge.

Berlin 1945 
Linge was one of many soldiers, servants, secretaries, and officers who moved into the Reich Chancellery and Führerbunker in Berlin in 1945. There he continued as Hitler's chief valet and protocol officer and was one of those who closely witnessed the last days of Hitler's life during the Battle of Berlin. He was also Hitler's personal military orderly. Linge delivered messages to Hitler and escorted people in to meet with Hitler. In addition, after Hitler's personal physician Theodor Morell left Berlin on 23 April, Linge and Dr. Werner Haase administered to Hitler the prepared medicine which had been left behind.

Two days before committing suicide on 30 April with Eva Braun, Hitler confided his suicide plan to Linge. He asked Linge to have their bodies wrapped in blankets and taken up to the garden to be cremated. Following his marriage to Eva Braun, Hitler spent the last night of his life lying awake and fully clothed on his bed.

On 30 April, Hitler had a last midday meal with his secretaries. After the meal, Linge spoke briefly with Eva Braun. He described her as looking pale and of having had little sleep. She thanked him for his service. Hitler then said farewell to each of his servants and subordinates. Thereafter, Hitler retired to his study at 3:15 p.m. There, Linge privately asked Hitler his orders. Hitler said that he was going to shoot himself and Linge knew what he had to do. "You must never allow my corpse to fall into the hands of the Russians", Hitler told Linge, "they would make a spectacle in Moscow out of my body and put it in waxworks". Further, he had given the order to break-out; Linge was to join one of the groups and try to get to the west. Linge asked for what they should now fight and Hitler replied, "For the coming man". Linge then saluted and left. In a 1974 episode of The World at War, Linge and Hitler's secretary, Traudl Junge, describe Hitler's last minutes in the bunker. Linge explains that Hitler and his wife committed suicide in Hitler's private room in the bunker. He recalled how he went into Hitler's private study after hearing a sudden bang and found that Hitler and Braun were dead. Hitler had shot himself in the right temple. Braun had taken what Linge concluded must have been cyanide poison.

After the suicides of Hitler and Braun, their corpses were reportedly carried up the stairs to ground level and through the bunker's emergency exit to the garden behind the Reich Chancellery, where they were doused with petrol. After the first attempts to ignite the petrol did not work, Linge went back inside the bunker and returned with a thick roll of papers. Martin Bormann lit the papers and threw the torch onto the bodies. As the two corpses caught fire, a small group, including Bormann, Linge, Otto Günsche, Joseph Goebbels, Erich Kempka, Peter Högl, Ewald Lindloff, and Hans Reisser, raised their arms in salute as they stood just inside the bunker doorway.

At around 16:15, Linge ordered SS-Untersturmführer Heinz Krüger and SS-Oberscharführer Werner Schwiedel to roll up the rug in Hitler's study to burn it. The two men removed the blood-stained rug, carried it up the stairs and outside to the Chancellery garden. There the rug was placed on the ground and burned. On and off during the afternoon, the Soviets shelled the area in and around the Reich Chancellery. SS guards brought over additional cans of petrol to further burn the corpses, which lasted from 16:00 to around 18:30. Linge later wrote that he burned other personal effects of Hitler's while an SS bodyguard oversaw the burial of the burnt bodies in a shell crater.

Linge was one of the last to leave the Führerbunker in the early morning hours of 1 May 1945. He teamed up with Erich Kempka. Linge was later captured near See-Strasse. Several days later, after his identity was revealed, two Soviet officers escorted Linge by train to Moscow where he was thrown into the notorious Lubjanka Prison.

Later life and death

Linge spent ten years in Soviet captivity and was released in 1955. During the imprisonment, Linge and Günsche were interrogated by the Soviet People's Commissariat for Internal Affairs (NKVD; later superseded by the Ministry of Internal Affairs; MVD) about the circumstances of Hitler's death. A dossier was edited by Soviet NKVD officers and presented to Joseph Stalin on 30 December 1949. The report was published in 2005 as The Hitler Book. Linge died in Hamburg, West Germany in 1980. His memoir, With Hitler to the End, was published by Frontline Books-Skyhorse Publishing, Inc. of London in July 2009 with an introduction by historian Roger Moorhouse, author of Killing Hitler.

Film portrayals 
Linge is portrayed by actor Thomas Limpinsel in Oliver Hirschbiegel's 2004 German film Downfall. In Hans-Jürgen Syberberg's Hitler: A Film from Germany (1977), he is played by Hellmut Lange. In the 1971 Eastern Bloc co-production Liberation V: The Final Assault, he was portrayed by East German actor Otto Busse.

See also 

 Führerbunker
 German prisoners of war in the Soviet Union
 Glossary of Nazi Germany
 List of Adolf Hitler's personal staff
 Hans Hermann Junge – also served as valet to Hitler
 Traudl Junge – secretary to Hitler

References

Citations

Bibliography

Further reading

External links 

1913 births
1980 deaths
SS-Obersturmbannführer
Military personnel from Bremen
Personal staff of Adolf Hitler
German prisoners of war in World War II held by the Soviet Union